Zăpodeni is a commune in Vaslui County, Western Moldavia, Romania. It is composed of nine villages: Butucăria, Ciofeni, Delea, Dobroslovești, Măcrești, Portari, Telejna, Uncești and Zăpodeni.

References

Communes in Vaslui County
Localities in Western Moldavia